Death Drive for the World Record (German: Die Todesfahrt im Weltrekord) is a 1929 German silent film directed by Kurt Blachy and starring Hermann Stetza, Claire Rommer and Valerie Boothby.

Cast
 Hermann Stetza as Salto King, der kreisende Komet  
 Claire Rommer as Evelyn Hall  
 Valerie Boothby as Ellen Montis  
 Carl Auen as Graf Thierry 
 Bernhard Goetzke as Kommissar Wolter  
 Gerhard Dammann as Der Zirkusdirektor  
 Louis Brody as Salto King's Faktotum  
 Greif as Der Polizeihund

References

Bibliography
 Bock, Hans-Michael & Bergfelder, Tim. The Concise Cinegraph: Encyclopaedia of German Cinema. Berghahn Books, 2009.

External links

1929 films
Films of the Weimar Republic
German silent feature films
Films directed by Kurt Blachy
Circus films
German black-and-white films
German crime films
1929 crime films
1920s German films
1920s German-language films